The 1972 ABA Playoffs was the postseason tournament of the American Basketball Association's 1971–1972 season. The tournament concluded with the Western Division champion Indiana Pacers defeating the Eastern Division champion New York Nets, four games to two in the 1972 ABA Finals.

Notable events

The Kentucky Colonels, despite finishing the season with the best record in the history of the ABA (68-16, .810), winning 8 of 11 regular season games against the New York Nets and finishing 24 games ahead of the Nets in the regular season standings, lost their first round series to the Nets.

The Floridians played their final game on April 6, 1972, losing at home in their Eastern Division semifinal series to the Virginia Squires 115-106.  The Squires swept the series 4 games to none behind rookie Julius Erving who grabbed at least seventeen rebounds in three of those four games.  On June 13, 1972, the league bought the Floridians and disbanded the team.

The Indiana Pacers became the first team to win a second ABA championship.

Freddie Lewis of the Pacers was the Most Valuable Player of the ABA playoffs.

This was the first season in which two future NBA teams met for the ABA Championship.  This only happened one other time in the league's history, during its final year in 1976 when the Denver Nuggets edged past the Colonels 4-3 to meet the Nets in the ABA championship series.

Five of the seven playoff series ended in final games in which the home team lost.

Western Division

Champion:  Indiana Pacers

Division Semifinals

(1) Utah Stars vs. (3) Dallas Chaparrals:
Stars win series 4-0
Game 1 @ Utah:  Utah 106, Dallas 96
Game 2 @ Utah:  Utah 113, Dallas 107
Game 3 @ Dallas:  Utah 96, Dallas 89
Game 4 @ Dallas:  Utah 103, Dallas 99

(2) Indiana Pacers vs. (4) Denver Rockets:
Pacers win series 4-3
Game 1 @ Indiana:  Indiana 102, Denver 96
Game 2 @ Indiana:  Denver 106, Indiana 105
Game 3 @ Denver:  Indiana 122, Denver 120
Game 4 @ Denver:  Denver 112, Indiana 96
Game 5 @ Indiana:  Indiana 91, Denver 79
Game 6 @ Denver:  Denver 106, Indiana 99
Game 7 @ Indiana:  Indiana 91, Denver 89

Division Finals

(1) Utah Stars vs. (2) Indiana Pacers:
Pacers win series 4-3
Game 1 @ Utah:  Utah 108, Indiana 100
Game 2 @ Utah:  Utah 117, Indiana 109
Game 3 @ Indiana:  Indiana 116, Utah 111
Game 4 @ Indiana:  Indiana 118, Utah 108
Game 5 @ Utah:  Utah 139, Indiana 130
Game 6 @ Indiana:  Indiana 105, Utah 99
Game 7 @ Utah:  Indiana 117, Utah 113

Eastern Division

Champion:  New York Nets

Division Semifinals

(1) Kentucky Colonels vs. (3) New York Nets:
Nets win series 4-2
Game 1 @ Kentucky:  New York 122, Kentucky 108
Game 2 @ Kentucky:  New York 105, Kentucky 90
Game 3 @ New York:  Kentucky 105, New York 99
Game 4 @ New York:  New York 100, Kentucky 92
Game 5 @ Kentucky:  Kentucky 109, New York 93
Game 6 @ New York:  New York 101, Kentucky 96

(2) Virginia Squires vs. (4) The Floridians:
Squires win series 4-0
Game 1 @ Virginia:  Virginia 114, Florida 107
Game 2 @ Virginia:  Virginia 125, Florida 100
Game 3 @ Florida:  Virginia 118, Florida 113
Game 4 @ Florida:  Virginia 115, Florida 106

Division Finals

(1) Virginia Squires vs. (3) New York Nets:
Nets win series 4-3
Game 1 @ Virginia:  Virginia 138, New York 91
Game 2 @ Virginia:  Virginia 115, New York 106
Game 3 @ New York:  New York 119, Virginia 117
Game 4 @ New York:  New York 118, Virginia 107
Game 5 @ Virginia:  Virginia 116, New York 107
Game 6 @ New York:  New York 146, Virginia 136
Game 7 @ Virginia:  New York 94, Virginia 88

ABA Finals

(2) Indiana Pacers VS. (3) New York Nets:
Pacers win series 4-2
Game 1 (May  6) @ Indiana:  Indiana 124, New York 103
Game 2 (May  9) @ Indiana:  New York 117, Indiana 115
Game 3 (May 12) @ New York:  Indiana 114, New York 108
Game 4 (May 15) @ New York:  New York 110, Indiana 105
Game 5 (May 18) @ Indiana:  Indiana 100, New York 99
Game 6 (May 20) @ New York:  Indiana 108, New York 105

External links
RememberTheABA.com page on 1972 ABA playoffs
Basketball-Reference.com's 1972 ABA Playoffs page

Playoffs
American Basketball Association playoffs